Asfarviridae is a family of viruses, the best-studied of which is African swine fever virus. They are double-stranded DNA viruses.

Taxonomy 

Viruses:

 Abalone asfarvirus
 African swine fever virus
 Dinodnavirus (Heterocapsa circularisquama DNA virus or hcDNAV)
 Faustovirus
 Kaumoebavirus
 Pacmanvirus
 Additional genomes known from environmental sampling of diverse marine, freshwater, and terrestrial habitats

References

 
Nucleocytoplasmic large DNA viruses
Virus families